RTÉjr is an Irish free-to-air children's television channel operated by state-owned broadcaster RTÉ. The channel mainly targets a demographic of 2- to 7-year-olds, but some cartoons for older children also air. The channel is part of RTÉ KIDS.

The channel broadcasts 12 hours of programming each day between 7:00 am and 7:00 pm. It is supported by radio station RTÉ Junior and additional services available on-demand, on mobile and online. The channel operates alongside its sister strand TRTÉ on RTÉ2.

History
RTÉjr was initially a programming block on public service broadcaster RTÉ2, launching on 20 September 2010, replacing Den Tots.

RTÉ planned on launching a television channel dedicated to RTÉjr; it launched on 27 May 2011, at 11:00 (IST). The channel does not carry advertising, in line with the broadcaster's policy not to target advertising towards those under 6 years of age.

By April 2013, the channel began a stand-alone schedule; however, plans to replace the RTÉjr block on RTÉ2 have yet to come to light. The channel broadcasts as a stand-alone channel with its own schedule and new programming.

Availability
The channel is available to 98% of television viewers in Ireland through Saorview. The channel became available on Virgin Media Ireland on channel 600 on 15 March 2012 and on Sky Ireland on channel 624 (635 in NI) on 15 April 2013. The channel's programming can be viewed internationally through its on-demand service, mobile services and website.

Programming
The channel has a wide range of domestically produced programming, either in-studio programming or animations. Its flagship programme is hosted by former Six member Emma O'Driscoll, Muireann NiChiobhain, Clara Murray and their puppet friends Séamus the dog and Bláithín the flower fairy. The channel has a strong focus on inclusive programming with a mix of programming in Irish, English and Irish Sign Language.

On 3 May 2011, RTÉjr broadcast Punky, the world's first animated series which focuses on the life and adventures of a girl with Down syndrome. The show is broadcast daily at 10:25 and 13:45. It was designed by award-winning Irish animation company Monster Animation and Design.

On 15 April 2013 the channel hosted 14 newly commissioned programmes, including the bilingual show Spraoi, the dance show Move It! and RTÉjr Workshop.

Current programming

Original programming 

 Abadas
 Alva's World
 Ar Mbia Ar Sli
 Atom Town
 Bing Bunny
 Body Brothers
 Boy Girl Dog Cat Mouse Cheese
 Circle Square
 Critters TV
 The Curious World of Professor Fun and Dr Dull
 Dig in Diner
 Dizzy Deliveries
 Donncha's Two Talented
 Fia's Fairies
 Fluffy Gardens
 Garth and Bev
 Happy the Hoglet
 The Imagination Machine
 Kiva Can Do
 Magical Sites
 Makers
 Mya Go
 Nelly & Nora
 Odo
 Ollie
 Pablo
 Paddles! The Huggable Polar Bear
 Pins and Nettie
 Puffin Rock
 Punky
 Ray of Sunshine
 Royals Next Door
 Shutterbugs
 Simon Says
 Storytime
 The Day Henry Met..?
 The Wee Littles 
 Tilly and Friends
 Twigin
 Zara World
 Zig and Zag

Acquired programming 
 The Adventures of Junior Bear
 Angelina Ballerina
 Balamory
 Bluey
 Bob the Builder
 Brave Bunnies
 Chuggington
 Claude
 Danger Mouse
 Daniel Tiger's Neighbourhood
 Dennis & Gnasher: Unleashed!
 Dog Loves Books
 Ella the Elephant
 Everything's Rosie
 Eskimo Girl
 Fireman Sam
 Garden Tales
 Go Jetters
 Grace's Amazing Machines
 Hey Duggee
 Inis SpraoiI Want a Pet
 JoJo & Gran Gran
 Jungle Beat: Munki and Trunk
 Kate and Mim-Mim
 Katie Morag
 Lifeboat Luke
 Lily's Driftwood Bay
 Love Monster
 Mike the Knight
 Molang
 Moon and Me
 Mr Bloom's Nursery
 My Pet and Me
 My World Kitchen
 Neverbored
 Nina and the Neurons
 The Numtums
 The Octonauts
 Our Seaside
 Out and About
 PAW Patrol
 Peppa Pig (original and Irish dub)
 Pip Ahoy!
 Pirata and Capitano
 Rainbow Butterfly, Unicorn Kitty
 Remy & Boo
 Ricky Zoom
 Scooby-Doo and Guess Who?
 Shaun the Sheep
 Show Me Show Me
 SwashBuckle Pirates
 The Game Catchers
 Thomas & Friends
 Thomas & Friends: All Engines Go
 The Travels of the Young Marco Polo
 Tree Fu Tom
 What's Your Game
 Wild Kratts
 Wild Things
 Wildernuts
 Woohoo Splash!
 Yakka Dee

Upcoming programming
 Sullivan Sails (TBA 2023)

References

External links
 

Children's television networks
Commercial-free television networks
JR
Television channels and stations established in 2013
Television in Ireland